Lacinutrix jangbogonensis is a Gram-negative, strictly aerobic, rod-shaped, psychrophilic and non-motile bacterium from the genus of Lacinutrix which has been isolated from marine sediments from the Ross Sea.

References 

Flavobacteria
Bacteria described in 2015